This is a list of all cricketers who have played first-class, List A or Twenty20 cricket for Border cricket team in South Africa. Seasons given are first and last seasons; the player did not necessarily play in all the intervening seasons.

A

 Gerhardt Abrahams, 2017/18–2018/19
 Hylton Ackerman, 1963/64–1965/66
 Maurice Adey, 1946/47–1947/48
 David Alers, 1981/82
 Philip Amm, 1997/98
 Carl André, 1903/04–1906/07
 William Ayres, 1939/40

B

 Faoud Bacchus, 1985/86
 Alan Badenhorst, 1991/92–1994/95
 Ryan Bailey, 2014/15
 Thomas Baillie, 1897/98
 Richard Baines, 1951/52–1952/53
 Capel Baines, 1929/30
 Edward Baker, 1960/61–1965/66
 Xen Balaskas, 1933/34
 Thomas Ball, 1977/78–1985/86
 Craig Ballantyne, 1994/95–1997/98
 Michael Ballantyne, 1974/75–1985/86
 GH Barnes, 1906/07
 R Barnes, 1902/03–1903/04
 A Barrington, 1926/27
 Simon Base, 1989/90–1993/94
 Arthur Bauer, 1939/40–1946/47
 Karl Bauermeister, 1987/88–1994/95
 Stanley Bayly, 1891/92–1898/99
 Walter Beauchamp, 1913/14–1923/24
 Alec Bedser, 1971/72
 Raymond Beesly, 1938/39–1953/54
 Bevan Bennett, 1997/98–2013/14
 Douglas Bennett, 1923/24
 Kevin Bennett, 2005/06–2015/16
 Allan Berry, 1925/26–1926/27
 William Bertram, 1902/03
 John Beveridge, 1929/30
 Frans Bezuidenhout, 1974/75–1979/80
 Ernest Birch, 1947/48–1948/49
 Gerald Blake, 1972/73
 Siyabonga Booi, 2007/08–2012/13
 Neil Boonzaaier, 1988/89–1989/90
 Clayton Bosch, 2011/12–2019/20
 Jerome Bossr, 2010/11–2019/20
 Johan Botha, 2004/05
 Piet Botha, 1992/93–2001/02
 Gary Boucher, 1976/77–1980/81
 Mark Boucher, 1994/95–2003/04
 Dudley Bowen, 1925/26
 Raymond Bowen, 1925/26–1934/35
 Harold Bowley, 1929/30–1939/40
 Carl Bradfield, 2004/05–2006/07
 Leo Bradshaw, 1906/07
 William Bremner, 1906/07
 Chris Brent, 1995/96
 Lofty Brits, 1950/51
 Tom Broster, 1902/03
 Darryl Brown, 2001/02–2016/17
 H Brown, 1908/09
 Kenneth Brown, 1991/92–1992/93
 Trevor Brown, 1950/51–1952/53
 Mark Bruyns, 2001/02–2003/04
 Clement Bryce, 1906/07
 John Buckley, 1979/80–1980/81
 Mbulelo Budaza, 2012/13–2014/15
 A Burnard, 1891/92–1898/99
 Owen Burns, 1936/37
 Ivan Busse, 1931/32–1946/47
 Robert Byron, 1928/29–1936/37

C

 Mkhululi Calana, 2006/07–2019/20
 James Carse, 1985/86–1993/94
 Wally Chalmers, 1950/51–1959/60
 Richard Chapman, 1938/39
 Frederick Cheshire, 1923/24–1929/30
 Ralph Cheshire, 1913/14–1929/30
 Anthony Chubb, 1947/48
 Geoff Chubb, 1931/32
 Thomas Clack, 1906/07–1909/10
 Alec Clarke, 1924/25–1929/30
 Gihahn Cloete, 2018/19–2019/20
 Cecil Closenberg, 1926/27–1934/35
 Shunter Coen, 1937/38
 Michael Coetzee, 1967/68–1972/73
 Trevor Collins, 1945/46–1949/50
 Kevin Commins, 1958/59–1960/61
 Arthur Cook, 1906/07–1909/10
 George Cook, 1902/03–1910/11
 Walter Cooper, 1922/23
 Mark Cornell, 1957/58–1960/61
 Patrick Cornell, 1951/52–1954/55
 Peter Cowan, 1981/82
 Jonathan Craniey, 2006/07–2019/20
 Vernon Cresswell, 1985/86
 Basil Crews, 1956/57–1957/58
 Frans Cronje, 1993/94–1996/97
 Gordon Cross, 1903/04–1922/23
 Daryll Cullinan, 1983/84–1995/96
 Ralph Cullinan, 1984/85–1988/89
 Alwyn Curnick, 1945/46–1948/49
 Norman Curry, 1973/74

D

 Gustav Dam, 1931/32
 Donald Davidson, 1936/37
 Frank Davidson, 1939/40
 Thomas Davidson, 1926/27
 Christopher Davies, 1969/70–1981/82
 Douglas Davies, 1902/03
 Marchant Davies, 1913/14
 Ossie Dawson, 1951/52–1961/62
 Anthony de Kock, 1963/64
 Shaun de Kock, 2000/01–2013/14
 Trevor Dennison, 1977/78
 Kevin Deutschmann, 1972/73–1973/74
 Andrew Dewar, 1991/92–1994/95
 Burton de Wett, 1999/00–2014/15
 Charles Dick, 1927/28
 Thomas Dickerson, 1920/21
 Michael Dilley, 1991/92–1992/93
 Tshepang Dithole, 2013/14
 Joshua Dodd, 2018/19–2019/20
 Dereck Dowling, 1937/38–1938/39
 Jeremey Drake, 1991/92
 Vasbert Drakes, 1996/97–2002/03
 Petrus Bouwer du Plessis, 1995/96–1997/98
 W du Plessis, 1982/83
 Daniel During, 1952/53–1959/60
 Athenkosi Dyili, 2000/01–2008/09

E

 Charles Eager, 1906/07
 Neville Edwards, 1965/66
 Justin Ehrke, 1992/93–1995/96
 Ronald Elliot-Wilson, 1928/29–1934/35
 Stephen Els, 1957/58–1959/60
 Stuart Els, 2019/20
 Willie Els, 1977/78
 Erik Emslie, 1991/92–1994/95
 Peter Emslie, 1992/93–1998/99
 Beverley Esterhuizen, 1995/96–1999/00
 Richard Evans, 1934/35–1939/40

F

 Kevin Farr, 1975/76–1976/77
 Philip Farrer, 1970/71
 Stephen Farrer, 1929/30–1947/48
 Buster Farrer, 1954/55–1969/70
 Sonwabile Fassi, 2008/09–2011/12
 Peter Fenix, 1958/59–1964/65
 Desmond Fenner, 1946/47–1966/67
 Trevor Fenner, 1962/63
 Evert Ferreira, 2000/01
 Jeftha Fetting, 1960/61–1971/72
 Nolan Flemmer, 1962/63
 Oswald Flemmer, 1925/26–1934/35
 Phaphama Fojela, 2002/03–2019/20
 Burton Forbes, 1997/98–1998/99
 John Forbes, 1952/53
 Mark Ford, 1986/87–1987/88
 Clyde Fortuin, 2015/16
 Brian Foulkes, 1983/84
 Ivor Foulkes, 1971/72–1987/88
 Brenden Fourie, 1987/88–1999/00
 Mathew Fourie, 2015/16–2019/20
 Shaun Fourie, 1992/93–1997/98
 Hugh Francois, 1923/24–1927/28
 Stanley Francois, 1923/24
 Gavin Fraser, 1981/82–1986/87
 Colin Fraser-Grant, 1929/30
 Robert Frisch, 1979/80–1980/81
 Leslie Fuhri, 1991/92–1995/96
 Graham Fuller, 1949/50–1951/52
 Harry Fuller, 1922/23–1926/27
 Sidney Fuller, 1906/07–1934/35

G

 Laden Gamiet, 1993/94–2008/09
 Ivor Gardiner, 1927/28–1937/38
 Murray Gardner, 1936/37
 C Garner, 1933/34–1934/35
 Redmund Geach, 1953/54–1958/59
 Trevor Geach, 1954/55–1956/57
 Graham Geldenhuys, 1984/85–1986/87
 Ottis Gibson, 1992/93–1994/95
 Norman Giddy, 1897/98–1903/04
 Frank Goldschmidt, 1920/21–1929/30
 Bruce Gordon, 1897/98–1903/04
 Kenneth Gordon, 1913/14
 Rodney Gordon, 1939/40–1940/41
 Gary Gower, 1973/74–1986/87
 Ayabulela Gqamane, 2004/05–2019/20
 Liam Graham, 1999/00–2003/04
 Tony Greig, 1964/65–1969/70
 Ian Greig, 1973/74–1979/80
 Kenneth Griffith, 1962/63–1964/65
 Michael Griffith, 1957/58–1964/65
 William Griffith, 1902/03
 Bruce Groves, 1965/66
 Terence Groves, 1965/66–1969/70

H

 Athol Hagemann, 1981/82
 N Hallows, 1983/84
 George Hammond, 1997/98–1999/00
 Anthony Hanley, 1939/40
 Martin Hanley, 1939/40
 Thomas Hardiman, 1985/86–1986/87
 William Hards, 1928/29
 Simon Harmer, 2016/17
 Rowan Harmuth, 1971/72–1972/73
 Michael Harper, 1967/68–1976/77
 Robert Harper, 1968/69–1976/77
 Edward Hartigan, 1902/03–1926/27
 Gerald Hartigan, 1903/04–1926/27
 Brian Hartley, 1962/63–1963/64
 Mansfield Hartley, 1981/82–1983/84
 Ian Harty, 1964/65–1981/82
 Chris Harvey, 1928/29
 Miles Harvey, 1971/72–1972/73
 William Harvey, 1906/07
 Bill Harvey, 1920/21
 Neville Hawkes, 1960/61–1962/63
 Alfred Haxton, 1963/64–1974/75
 Kenneth Hay, 1951/52–1955/56
 Arthur Hayes, 1950/51–1954/55
 Gregory Hayes, 1972/73–1987/88
 Demitri Hayidakis, 1936/37–1947/48
 Jack Hayward, 1928/29
 Peter Heger, 1963/64–1971/72
 Tyron Henderson, 1998/99–2003/04
 A Henwood, 1971/72
 Bob Herman, 1972/73
 Alfred Hicks, 1949/50–1952/53
 Warwick Hinkel, 1997/98–2006/07
 Allan Hinton, 1959/60
 Sid Hird, 1950/51
 Mackie Hobson, 1990/91–1992/93
 Gavin Hogg, 1977/78
 Dennis Hollard, 1947/48
 Ernest Holmes, 1939/40
 Geoff Holmes, 1989/90
 Brendan Horan, 1995/96–1997/98
 Jeffrey Hosking, 1980/81–1984/85
 Bennett Howe, 1955/56
 David Howell, 1989/90–1991/92
 Ian Howell, 1984/85–1997/98
 Percival Hubbard, 1929/30–1946/47
 Neil Hunter, 1961/62–1968/69
 Julian Hykes, 2001/02–2009/10

J

 Kyle Jacobs, 2018/19
 Newton Jarman, 1910/11
 Christopher Jarvis, 1975/76–1976/77
 Winston Jenkins, 1929/30
 Trevor Jesty, 1973/74
 ABE Johnson, 1902/03–1903/04
 Charles Johnson, 1906/07–1920/21
 Keith Johnson, 1955/56–1958/59
 Mark Joko, 2007/08–2009/10
 Adrian Jones, 1981/82
 Christiaan Jonker, 2015/16–2018/19

K

 Nathaniel Kaschula, 1965/66–1976/77
 Henry Kelly, 1923/24–1926/27
 Donald Kemp, 1951/52–1955/56
 John Kemp, 1946/47–1949/50
 John Kemp, 1975/76–1976/77
 Raymond Kemp, 1967/68–1977/78
 Richard Kent, 1974/75–1982/83
 Stephen Ker-Fox, 1967/68–1993/94
 Ian Key, 1976/77
 Wilfrid Kidson, 1931/32
 Jongile Kilani, 2014/15–2015/16
 CW King, 1897/98–1898/99
 Greg King, 1995/96
 Noel Kirsten, 1946/47–1960/61
 Paul Kirsten, 1990/91–1991/92
 Peter Kirsten, 1990/91–1996/97
 Cecil Kirton, 1950/51–1952/53
 Keith Kirton, 1945/46–1959/60
 Johan Klopper, 1997/98–2000/01
 HE Knight, 1923/24–1924/25
 Norman Knight, 1966/67–1974/75
 Donald Knott, 1986/87–1991/92
 Sidney Knott, 1951/52–1964/65
 Gionne Koopman, 2004/05–2017/18
 Athule Kotta, 2019/20
 Colin Kretzmann, 1968/69–1970/71
 Justin Kreusch, 1997/98–2012/13
 Murray Krug, 1991/92–1992/93
 Siphamandla Krweqe, 2012/13–2018/19
 Clifford Kuhn, 1951/52

L

 Henry Lacey, 1949/50–1956/57
 Walter Lamplough, 1897/98
 Sithembile Langa, 2010/11–2018/19
 Charl Langeveldt, 2003/04
 Errol Laughlin, 1976/77–1983/84
 John Laurie, 1963/64
 John Lawrence, 1980/81–1984/85
 Andrew Lawson, 1991/92–1994/95
 Michael Lax, 1993/94–1994/95
 Marvin Lazarus, 2012/13
 Donovan Lentz, 1995/96–2005/06
 Raymond le Roux, 1988/89
 Thapelo Letsholo, 2014/15–2015/16
 Philip Levy, 1969/70–1970/71
 Hugo Lindenberg, 1986/87–1991/92
 Adolph Lipke, 1939/40–1947/48
 Ian Lloyd, 1956/57
 Henry Londt, 1903/04
 Bryan Lones, 1986/87–1993/94
 Bruce Long, 1971/72–1974/75
 Grant Long, 1985/86–1990/91
 Geoff Love, 1994/95–2002/03
 Charles Lownds, 1947/48–1948/49
 Lucky Lwana, 2001/02–2013/14
 Anthony Lyons, 1981/82

M

 Charles McAlister, 1920/21–1926/27
 Charles McCalgan, 1978/79
 Colin McCallum, 1920/21
 Cecil McCallum, 1920/21
 Ian McClenaghan, 1968/69–1978/79
 Rod McCurdy, 1992/93
 John McDonagh, 1913/14
 Ken McEwan, 1967/68–1991/92
 Michael McGill, 1975/76–1979/80
 Donald McKenna, 1973/74–1979/80
 Gary McKinnon, 1990/91–1991/92
 Sisanda Magala, 2019/20
 Sihle Magongoma, 2018/19
 Phumzile Majaja, 2016/17–2017/18
 Dumisa Makalima, 1997/98–2004/05
 Bongolwethu Makeleni, 2012/13–2019/20
 Malibongwe Maketa, 1996/97–2002/03
 Viyusa Makhaphela, 2003/04–2014/15
 Lizo Makhosi, 2018/19
 Sithembile Makongolo, 2000/01–2009/10
 Mncedisi Malika, 2013/14–2019/20
 Brian Mallinson, 1971/72
 Lwando Manase, 2003/04–2004/05
 Claude Mandy, 1931/32
 George Mandy, 1933/34–1947/48
 Marco Marais, 2009/10–2018/19
 CW Marsh, 1920/21
 Barry Marshall, 1974/75–1975/76
 Kenneth Marshall, 1963/64–1967/68
 Lazola Masingatha, 2006/07–2009/10
 Michael Matika, 2001/02–2005/06
 Mzuvukile Matomela, 1998/99–2001/02
 Bradley Mauer, 2017/18–2019/20
 Lundi Mbane, 2001/02–2015/16
 Loyiso Mdashe, 2006/07–2016/17
 Philip Melville, 1926/27
 Aviwe Mgijima, 2003/04–2007/08
 Alindile Mhletywa, 2019/20
 Eric Miles, 1920/21–1929/30
 Lawrence Miles, 1913/14–1933/34
 R Miller, 1936/37
 Ian Milne, 1957/58
 Gordon Minkley, 1962/63–1970/71
 Harold Minkley, 1950/51
 Norman Minnaar, 1982/83–1986/87
 Ian Mitchell, 1994/95–2002/03
 Neil Mitchell, 1954/55
 Sinethemba Mjekula, 2010/11
 Avumile Mnci, 2008/09–2017/18
 Akhona Mnyaka, 2012/13–2017/18
 Thandolwethu Mnyaka, 2010/11–2016/17
 Luthando Mnyanda, 2004/05–2011/12
 Leslie Mobbs, 1958/59
 Raymond Morkel, 1935/36–1939/40
 Roger Moult, 1988/89–1989/90
 James Muir, 1926/27
 John Mullen, 1910/11
 John Muller, 1959/60
 Leslie Muller, 1963/64
 IB Murray, 1920/21
 Arthur Murrell, 1910/11–1913/14
 Jack Muzzell, 1928/29–1934/35
 Peter Muzzell, 1957/58–1969/70
 Ayavuya Myoli, 2008/09–2012/13

N

 Tsepo Ndwandwa, 2015/16–2017/18
 Brian Ndzundzu, 1993/94–1995/96
 Frederick Nel, 1955/56
 Siyabulela Nelani, 1997/98–2002/03
 Craig Nelson, 1993/94
 Gerald Nelson, 1961/62–1981/82
 Ira Neuper, 1950/51
 Lewis Newnham, 1903/04
 Sekela Ngadlela, 2014/15–2016/17
 Mfuneko Ngam, 2005/06
 Mlungisi Ngece, 1997/98–2004/05
 Collan Nicholas, 1954/55
 Jason Niemand, 2013/14–2019/20
 Desmond Niland, 1936/37–1947/48
 Arthur Norton, 1909/10
 Norman Norton, 1906/07–1910/11
 David Nosworthy, 1991/92–1995/96
 Jerry Nqolo, 2006/07–2018/19
 Makhaya Ntini, 1994/95–2003/04
 Sinovuyo Ntuntwana, 2010/11–2019/20

O

 John Ogilvie, 1976/77
 Yamkela Oliphant, 2009/10–2017/18
 Mario Olivier, 2005/06–2008/09
 Rodney Ontong, 1972/73–1984/85
 Roelof Oosthuizen, 1913/14
 Graeme Ortlieb, 1995/96
 Bradley Osborne, 1979/80–1994/95
 Timothy Overton, 1966/67

P

 Steve Palframan, 1991/92–1996/97
 Lucky Pangabantu, 2004/05–2015/16
 Lindsay Pearson, 1982/83–1983/84
 Keith Peinke, 2001/02–2004/05
 N Perry, 1931/32
 Arthur Peters, 1936/37
 Moses Pethu, 1996/97–2005/06
 Graham Pfuhl, 1981/82–1983/84
 CW Phillips, 1920/21
 Dudley Phillips, 1924/25–1929/30
 Howard Phillips, 1906/07–1913/14
 Ivor Phillips, 1957/58–1958/59
 John Phillips, 1931/32–1935/36
 James Phillips, 1987/88
 Leroy Phillips, 1986/87–1989/90
 Ricey Phillips, 1939/40–1956/57
 Charles Pope, 1966/67–1979/80
 Steven Pope, 1990/91–2005/06
 Frank Porter, 1908/09
 Jacques Porter, 2019/20
 Kenneth Postman, 1979/80
 Guy Preston, 1909/10–1910/11
 Donnie Preston, 1946/47–1947/48
 Denham Price, 1964/65
 Justin Price, 1994/95
 Murray Price, 1955/56–1965/66
 Charles Prince, 1897/98–1898/99
 Andrew Pringle, 2002/03–2003/04
 William Pringle, 1902/03
 Henry Prior, 1928/29
 Henry Promnitz, 1924/25–1927/28

Q
 Sinethemba Qeshile, 2014/15–2019/20

R

 Victor Radloff, 1992/93
 William Radloff, 1988/89–1992/93
 Romano Ramoo, 2000/01–2013/14
 Darryn Randall, 2009/10
 Ronnie Randell, 1906/07–1925/26
 RN Randell, 1902/03
 Murray Ranger, 1998/99–2009/10
 Raymond Ranger, 1975/76–1985/86
 Jason Raubenheimer, 2015/16–2019/20
 Lilitha Reed, 2019/20
 Bernard Reid, 1934/35–1936/37
 Seymour Reid, 1946/47–1947/48
 Wilhelm Rein, 1947/48
 Paul Reynolds, 1957/58
 Rowan Richards, 2005/06
 Matthew Richardson, 2005/06–2009/10
 Reginald Richter, 1933/34–1939/40
 Theophilus Riemer, 1897/98
 Warne Rippon, 1987/88
 Anthony Roberts, 1989/90–1990/91
 Bruce Roberts, 1991/92
 P Roberts, 1922/23
 V Roberts, 1933/34
 WE Roberts, 1910/11–1923/24
 Lonwabo Rodolo, 2010/11–2016/17

S

 John Sansom, 1962/63–1965/66
 Keith Sansom, 1977/78–1980/81
 Russell Sansom, 1977/78–1979/80
 Victor Schaefer, 1929/30
 Samuel Schmidt, 1973/74–1980/81
 Arrie Schoeman, 1988/89–1995/96
 Edwin Schreiber, 1954/55–1966/67
 Dirk Scott, 1978/79–1984/85
 Malcolm Scott, 1964/65–1968/69
 Walter Scott, 1923/24
 Kabelo Sekhukhune, 2016/17–2017/18
 Bennett Sekonyela, 2002/03–2004/05
 Somila Seyibokwe, 2005/06–2018/19
 R Shaw, 1920/21
 Cecil Shearman, 1920/21–1937/38
 Arthur Shingler, 1902/03–1903/04
 Peter Shuman, 1954/55
 Phil Simmons, 1992/93
 Kenneth Skelding, 1970/71
 Angus Small, 1991/92
 Charles Smith, 1929/30
 Gary Smith, 1979/80
 Michael Smith, 2001/02–2005/06
 Robert Smith, 1946/47–1950/51
 Tip Snooke, 1897/98–1908/09
 Charles Snyman, 1950/51–1953/54
 Abongile Sodumo, 2000/01–2014/15
 Kenneth Solomon, 1958/59
 Basil Southwood, 1926/27–1928/29
 Frederick Spence, 1934/35–1937/38
 Murray Spence, 2006/07–2012/13
 Carl Spilhaus, 1993/94–1995/96
 Arthur Sprenger, 1908/09–1913/14
 Alec Stander, 1997/98–2010/11
 William Steele, 1966/67–1970/71
 Daniel Stephen, 1993/94–1997/98
 David Stephen, 1972/73–1977/78
 Quentin Still, 1991/92–1996/97
 Craig Stirk, 1989/90–1990/91
 Frederick Stirton, 1906/07
 Michael Stonier, 1992/93–1995/96
 Richard Stretch, 1979/80–1981/82
 Pieter Strydom, 1992/93–2003/04
 Glenton Stuurman, 2019/20
 Elliot Style, 1910/11–1913/14
 Craig Sugden, 1998/99–2003/04
 Francis Sutton, 1902/03
 James Swallow, 1906/07–1908/09
 Malcolm Sylvester, 1971/72
 E Symons, 1906/07

T

 Coventry Tainton, 1929/30
 Warwick Tainton, 1949/50–1961/62
 Dion Taljard, 1992/93–1999/00
 Alan Tarr, 1922/23–1923/24
 Trevor Tarr, 1951/52
 Dummy Taylor, 1947/48–1949/50
 Peter Taylor, 1959/60–1964/65
 Roy Taylor, 1969/70–1975/76
 Bryn Thomas, 1997/98–2009/10
 Greg Thomas, 1983/84–1986/87
 Gregory Thompson, 1987/88–1994/95
 N Thompson, 1980/81
 Robin Thorne, 1948/49–1964/65
 Patrick Thornton, 1933/34
 Craig Thyssen, 2007/08–2012/13
 Steve Tikolo, 1995/96
 Denis Tomlinson, 1928/29
 Dexter Toppin, 1988/89–1989/90
 Michael Tramontino, 1983/84
 Wallace Treadaway, 1947/48–1949/50
 Dudley Tricker, 1963/64–1970/71
 Emmerson Trotman, 1984/85–1991/92
 Cebo Tshiki, 2003/04–2012/13

V

 Yaseen Vallie, 2016/17–2019/20
 Cassie van der Merwe, 1997/98–1999/00
 Daniel van Heerden, 1974/75
 Grant van Heerden, 1992/93
 Michael van Vuuren, 1991/92–1992/93
 Gavin Victor, 1992/93–1993/94
 Bryan Voke, 2006/07–2008/09
 Gareth von Hoesslin, 2004/05–2006/07

W

 Alfred Wainwright, 1906/07–1926/27
 Iain Wainwright, 1972/73–1976/77
 Charles Wakefield, 1897/98
 Charles Wakefield, 1920/21
 Bryan Wakeford, 1945/46–1949/50
 Basheeru-Deen Walters, 2018/19
 Martin Walters, 1998/99–2018/19
 Alan Ward, 1971/72
 Cecil Warner, 1929/30
 Thomas Warner, 1922/23–1929/30
 John Warren, 1897/98–1898/99
 Kenny Watson, 1972/73–1991/92
 Ray Watson-Smith, 1969/70
 Arthur Weakley, 1965/66–1980/81
 Gary Weber, 1975/76
 Charles Weir, 1897/98–1903/04
 Alan Wells, 1981/82
 Colin Wells, 1980/81
 Sidney Wewege, 1936/37–1937/38
 Brad White, 1996/97–1999/00
 Cyril White, 1929/30–1951/52
 Clive White, 1936/37
 Stanley White, 1934/35–1939/40
 JK Whitehead, 1903/04–1906/07
 Murray Whitehead, 1929/30–1931/32
 Denzil Whitfield, 1962/63
 Harold Whitfield, 1936/37–1953/54
 Wayne Wiblin, 1995/96–2001/02
 George Wienand, 1934/35–1953/54
 Michael Wild, 1954/55
 Vernon Wild, 1962/63–1967/68
 Andrew Wilkins, 1962/63–1964/65
 Albert Wilkins, 1931/32–1934/35
 Chris Wilkins, 1962/63–1970/71
 Brandon Williams, 2006/07–2016/17
 Bradley Williams, 2016/17–2019/20
 Keith Willows, 1970/71–1972/73
 Lorrie Wilmot, 1985/86–1988/89
 Aiden Wilson, 1903/04–1906/07
 Craig Wilson, 1994/95–1997/98
 James Wilson, 1996/97–2000/01
 Kyle Wilson, 2004/05–2010/11
 William Wilson, 1956/57
 Errol Witherden, 1954/55–1958/59
 Graham Witney, 1954/55
 Rex Witte, 1933/34
 Hubert Wood, 1920/21–1924/25
 JF Wood, 1908/09–1909/10
 T Wood, 1906/07
 Denys Woods, 1946/47–1953/54
 Neil Wrede, 1964/65–1968/69

X
 Bamanye Xenxe, 2010/11–2019/20

Y
 Nonelela Yikha, 2019/20
 Chase Young, 2006/07–2011/12

Z

 Malwande Zamo, 2010/11–2019/20
 Trevor Ziemann, 1967/68
 Monde Zondeki, 2000/01–2004/05

Notes

References

Cricket in South Africa
Border